Trigonocerina is a genus of flies in the family Stratiomyidae.

Species
Trigonocerina flaviventris Lindner, 1964

References

Stratiomyidae
Brachycera genera
Taxa named by Erwin Lindner
Diptera of South America